Jack Peter Evans (born 19 March 1993) is an English footballer who plays as a midfielder for Isthmian League South East Division club Chatham Town.

Career

Gillingham
Born in Gravesend, Evans joined Gillingham at the age of seven and progressed through the ranks of the youth team. He signed his first professional contract in April 2011. Evans joined Conference South side Lewes in February 2011 on a one-month loan deal, making four appearances. He made his professional debut for Gillingham on 15 October 2011 against Torquay United, as a last minute substitute for Chris Whelpdale. In December 2011, Evans joined Conference South outfit Welling United on an initial one-month loan which was later extended. Evans was offered a free transfer by Gillingham manager Martin Allen in January 2013, along with three other young professionals. Evans was loaned to Dartford for an initial one-month spell in late January. This loan spell was extended by an additional month in late February.

Non league
On 29 May 2013, it was announced that Evans had signed for Conference National side Tamworth, with the player expected to fill the void left by Richard Tait's departure to Cambridge United. Evans then joined Sutton United, and then signed for Eastbourne Borough. In the summer of 2016 Evans signed for Maidstone United, who had just won promotion to the National League. In January 2017 Evans joined Hastings United on loan.

On 17 March 2017, following his loan spell with Hastings United, Evans joined National League South side Margate. Currently Club Captain at Chatham Town who play in the Premier Division of the Southern Counties East Football League.

Career statistics

References

External links

1993 births
Living people
Sportspeople from Gravesend, Kent
English footballers
Association football defenders
English Football League players
National League (English football) players
Gillingham F.C. players
Lewes F.C. players
Welling United F.C. players
Corby Town F.C. players
Dartford F.C. players
Tamworth F.C. players
Sutton United F.C. players
Eastbourne Borough F.C. players
Maidstone United F.C. players
Hastings United F.C. players
Margate F.C. players